Edwin Francis Gay (October 27, 1867 – February 8, 1946) was an American economist, Professor of Economic History and first Dean of the Harvard Business School.

Biography 
Born in Detroit, as the son of a rich businessman, Gay attended schools in the United States and in Switzerland. In 1890, he obtained his A.B. in history and philosophy at the University of Michigan. He returned to Europe to study agriculture, industry, trade and history at universities in Leipzig, Göttingen. Zurich, Berlin and London. In 1892, he married his Michigan classmate Louise Randolph, with whom he shared his research. In 1902, he received his PhD from the University of Berlin under supervision of Gustav Schmoller.

Back in the United States, in 1902, Gay was appointed instructor at the Harvard University, replacing William Ashley. In 1903 he was promoted Assistant Professor, and in 1906 Professor in the chair of Economic History at Harvard.

Gay was the first Dean of the Harvard Business School from 1908-1919.  The Harvard Business School was founded in 1908 and started the first year with 59 students. In the 1920s, there were over 500 students. 

He was a founding member of the Council on Foreign Relations, and served as its first elected secretary and treasurer, 1921 – 1933, then as vice-president, until 1944, succeeding co-founder Paul D. Cravath.

In 1921 he was elected as a Fellow of the American Statistical Association. From 1929 onwards, he was the representative for America, and de facto co-chairman, of the International Scientific Committee on Price History.

He was president of the New York Evening Post from 1920-1923.

Selected publications
Books, a selection:
 Burritt, A. W., Dennison, H. S., Gay, E. F., Heilman, R. E., & Kendall, H. P. (1918). Profit Sharing, Its Principles and Practice: A Collaboration. Harper & Brothers.
 Gay, Edwin Francis. The rhythm of history. 1923.
 Gay, Edwin Francis, et al. Facts and factors in economic history: articles by former students of Edwin Francis Gay. Harvard University Press, 1932.
 Hamilton, Alexander, Arthur H. Cole, and Edwin Francis Gay. Industrial and Commercial Correspondence of Alexander Hamilton: Anticipating His Report on Manufactures. Augustus M. Kelley, 1968.

Articles, a selection:
 Gay, Edwin Francis. "The Inquisitions of Depopulation in 1517 and the'Domesday of Inclosures'." Transactions of the Royal Historical Society 14.1 (1900): 231-303.

About Gray:
 Heaton, Herbert. A scholar in action, Edwin F. Gay. Greenwood Press, 1968.

Honors 
To his memory, the Edwin F. Gay-Award for Economic History has been created. One of the award winners has been the historian Richard H. Tilly.

Archives and records
Dean's Office Correspondence Files (Edwin F. Gay, Dean) at Baker Library Special Collections, Harvard Business School.

References 

1867 births
1946 deaths
American newspaper publishers (people)
American business theorists
Writers from Detroit
University of Michigan College of Literature, Science, and the Arts alumni
Harvard Business School faculty
Fellows of the American Statistical Association
Presidents of the American Economic Association
Business school deans
Economists from Michigan